Cuicatlán District is located in the south of the Cañada Region of the State of Oaxaca, Mexico. The district includes 20 municipalities, bringing together a total of 233 settlements.

Municipalities

The district includes the following municipalities:
 
Cuyamecalco Villa de Zaragoza
Chiquihuitlán de Benito Juárez
Concepción Pápalo
San Andrés Teotilalpam
San Francisco Chapulapa
San Juan Bautista Cuicatlán
San Juan Bautista Tlacoatzintepec
San Juan Tepeuxila
San Miguel Santa Flor
San Pedro Jaltepetongo
San Pedro Jocotipac
San Pedro Sochiapam
San Pedro Teutila
Santa Ana Cuauhtémoc
Santa María Pápalo
Santa María Texcatitlán
Santa María Tlalixtac
Santiago Nacaltepec
Santos Reyes Pápalo
Valerio Trujano

References

Districts of Oaxaca
Cañada, Oaxaca